Washing Wells Roman Fort, was a fort in the Roman province of Britannia.

History
The fort has not been excavated.

References

External links

Roman fortifications in England
Roman sites in Tyne and Wear